Nebraska Link 28B (L-28B) is a connecting link highway which connects U.S. Route 275 west of Omaha to U.S. Route 6 in Omaha.

Route description
L-28B begins at an interchange with U.S. Route 275 (US 275) west of Omaha.  The connections from US 275 eastbound to L-28B eastbound and from L-28B westbound to US 275 westbound make up the dominant road.  Eastbound US 275 traffic must exit to stay on the route, while westbound L-28B traffic must exit to access eastbound US 275.  Continuing east, L-28B meets 228th Street, which extends to Waterloo, at a diamond interchange.  It crosses the Elkhorn River and then meets Skyline Drive, in Elkhorn, at a partial cloverleaf interchange.  Now in Omaha, the road is named West Dodge Road. L-28B ends at an interchange with westbound U.S. Route 6 and Nebraska Highway 31.  West Dodge Road continues towards Downtown Omaha as eastbound US 6.  The entire route's speed limit was increased from 65 mph to 70 mph in July 2018

Major intersections

References

Link 28B
Transportation in Omaha, Nebraska